Nicole Bradtke was the defending champion but did not compete that year.

Sandra Cacic won in the final 6–3, 1–6, 6–4 against Barbara Paulus.

Seeds
A champion seed is indicated in bold text while text in italics indicates the round in which that seed was eliminated.

  Irina Spîrlea (first round)
  Barbara Paulus (final)
  Judith Wiesner (first round)
  Joannette Kruger (second round)
  Angélica Gavaldón (first round)
  Kyoko Nagatsuka (first round)
  Sabine Hack (quarterfinals)
  Wang Shi-ting (first round)

Draw

External links
 ITF tournament edition details

WTA Auckland Open
1996 WTA Tour